This is a list of mosques in Tajikistan.

See also
 Islam in Tajikistan
 Lists of mosques

References

External links

Tajikistan
Islam in Tajikistan
Mosques